Xavier Blum Pinto (born 1957 in Guayaquil) is an Ecuadorian artist.  From 1974 to 1976 he studied architecture at the Universidad Catolica Santiago de Guayaquil, in Ecuador.  In 1981, obtained his MA in Fine Arts from the Universitė of Paris VIII, France.

In 1996 he participated in the São Paulo Art Biennial.

Individual exhibitions
2006 "Memoria Palafitica", MAAC (Museo Antropológico y de Arte Contemporáneo), Guayaquil.
2005 "Memoria Palafitica", Galería – Café "Dada", Guayaquil
2005 "Ciudad Devuelta", Galería "El Conteiner", (Quito – Ecuador)
2004 "Ciudad Devuelta", Galería Mirador, Universidad Católica Santiago de Guayaquil
2000 Café Galería Casa Azul  (Salinas - Ecuador)
1997 Galería La Manzana Verde (Guayaquil)
1997 Galería  X. Blum  (Ballenita - Ecuador)
1996 Galería and Cultural Centro, Ballenita, Ecuador.
1995 Salinas Yacht Club, Salt mines, Ecuador;
1995 Pacific National Bank, Miami, United States.
1994 School of Comunicacion Monica Herrera, Guayaquil, Ecuador.
1993 Galería X. Blum, Guayaquil, Ecuador.
1992 School of Architects of the Guayas, Guayaquil, Ecuador;
1992 Stage area Performance Gallery, Miami, United States.
1991 Galería ART-You, Quito, Ecuador.
1990 Feminine society of Culture, Guayaquil, Ecuador.
1989 Mayan Inca, Paris, France;
1989 Galería, Guayaquil, Ecuador;
1989 House of the Culture, Quito, Ecuador.
1988 Museum of Art of the Central bank, Guayaquil, Ecuador;
1988 Galería and Cultural Centro, Ballenita, Ecuador;
1988 Commercial center the Display cabinets, Guayaquil, Ecuador.
1987 The Store, Galerģa de Arte, River basin, Ecuador;
1987 Galería and Cultural Centro X. Blum, Guayaquil, Ecuador;
1987 Faculty of Architecture of the Catolica University of Santiago de Guayaquil, Ecuador;
1987 House of the Nöcleo Culture of the Guayas, Guayaquil, Ecuador.
1986 Blanca Even Guarderas of Fasinarm, Center of Resources, Guayaquil, Ecuador.
1985 Artefactoría, Galería Factory, Guayaquil, Ecuador.
1984 The Oca, Galerģa Cafė, Guayaquil, Ecuador.
1983 Gallery do Theatre in Herbe, Paris, France; The Engreģdo Vegetable, Bot˛nico Garden, Guayaquil, Ecuador.
1981 Municipal museum of Santiago de Guayaquil, Ecuador.

Group exhibitions
2007 Moradas Interiores, MAAC, (Museo Antropológico y de Arte Contemporáneo), Guayaquil
2904 30 Ideas, Museo Meguro (Tokio – Japon)
2004 8va. Bienal Internacional de Cuenca, Ecuador
2002 Piqueo Haptico, Arte no Visual (Antiguo Mercado Sur) Guayaquil
2001 10 Años Después, Universidad Católica (Guayaquil)
2001 Ayampe 2001, Arte y Ecología.  Performance (Playas de Ayampe – Ecuador)
2000 Ayampe 2000, Arte y Ecología.  Performance (Playas de Ayampe – Ecuador)
2000 COLOR DELFIN, XACL Valla pública y acción interactiva en la red. (Guayaquil)
1999 Banderita tricolor (Galería Madeleine Hollaender - Guayaquil)
1999 Esculturas Efímeras, en playas ecuatorianas. XACL
1998 Esculturas Luz. XACL (Escuela de Comunicación Mónica Herrera - Guayaquil)
1998 Unico en su género. Libros de artistas del Ecuador  (Philadelphia - EE.UU.)
1998 Formación de XACL, dupla creativa con Claudia Maldonado
1997 Ecuador Contemporáneo  (Palacio de Linares - Madrid - España)
1997 El Arranque  (Galería Madeleine Hollaender - Guayaquil)
1997 Club Latinoamericano de Papeleros  (São Paulo - Brasil)
1997 Apéndice  (ZUÁKATA espacio - alternativo, Guayaquil)
1997 Intervenciones Urbanas  (Buenos Aires - Argentina)
1997 Arte de Papel  (Art Forvm - Quito)
1997 8/4  (Alianza Francesa - Guayaquil)  ZUÁKATA
1997 Ayampe 5 Cerros  (Ayampe - Ecuador)  ZUÁKATA
1996 Soledad Urbana  (Guayaquil)  ZUÁKATA
1996 XXIII  Bienal de São Paulo  (Brasil)
1996 Invadumbre  (Guayaquil)  ZUÁKATA
1996 Salón de Selección de la Bienal de São Paulo  (Quito)
1996 Museo de los Amantes de Sumpa  (Sta. Elena - Ecuador)
1996 Punta Blanca 96, White End, Ecuador.
1995 Imágenes y Texturas   (Museo Banco Central  - Guayaquil)
1995 Punta Blanca 95, White End, Ecuador; Images and Textures, Museum Central bank, Guayaquil, Ecuador.
1994 Salón de Julio, Municipal Museum, Guayaquil, Ecuador;
1994 The daily thing of the Art, Municipal Museum, Guayaquil, Ecuador;
1994 Exposicion Collection of Ceramics, Galerģa Madeleine Hollander, Guayaquil, Ecuador.
1993 Catolica University Faculty of Arquitetura, Guayaquil, Ecuador.
1992 Exposicion X. Blum and Hernan Zuniga, Galerģa X. Blum, Guayaquil, Ecuador;
1992 Exposicion 500 To you, Buenos Aires, Argentina.
1991 Exposicion Art of the 90 Room of Art L'ART, Quito, Ecuador.
1990 III Prė-Biennial de Pintura, River basin, Ecuador;
1990 Exposicion 10 to you, 100 Editions, 100 Artists, Magazine DINERS, Quito, Ecuador.
1989 Week of Ecuador in France, Paris, France;
1989 First Saltacion of Proesa Art, House of the Culture, Quito, Ecuador;
1989 Museum Nahim Isaģas, Guayaquil, Ecuador;
1989 II FLAAC Latin American Festival of Art and Culture, Brasģlia, Brazil;
1989 Galerģa Cafė Marries of the Culture, Guayaquil, Ecuador;
1989 traveling exhibition Houston, Texas United States; Santiago, Chile; Buenos Aires, Argentina;
1988 Hall October, Guayaquil, Ecuador;
1988 Prė-Biennial, River basin, Ecuador;
1988 Museum of Contemporary Hispanic Arts MOCHA, New York City, United States;
1988 Exhibit with Artefactoría, Guayaquil, Ecuador.
1988 House of Espa ˜ to, New York City, United States.
1987  Hall Julio, Museum of the Central bank, Guayaquil, Ecuador;
1987 Art in the Street, Guayaquil, Ecuador.
1986 Prė-Biennial Nacional de Pintura, Museum of Modern Art, River basin, Ecuador;
1986 Ecuadorian painters by Amnistģa the International, Ecuador.
1985 Painters of Ecuador, San Josė, Costa Rica;
1985 EncontrArte VII, Park of Chipipe, Salt Mines, Ecuador.
1984 Mariano Aguilera, Quito, Ecuador;
1984 First National Biennial of Drawing, Guayaquil, Ecuador;
1984 Format, Galerģa Monaschka, Guayaquil, Ecuador;
1984 Hotel the Gilded one, River basin, Ecuador;
1984 Continental hotel, Guayaquil, Ecuador.
1984 Galerģa Monaschka, Guayaquil, Ecuador;
1984 EncontrArte, Chipipe Park, Salt mines, Ecuador; EncontrArte V, Municipal Pal˛cio, Guayaquil, Ecuador; EncontrArte IV, House of the Culture, Quito, Ecuador.
1983 Nacional Vicente Rocafuerte, Guayaquil, Ecuador; Quito, Ecuador; River Basin, Ecuador;
1983 Hotel of Ville, Lille, France;
1983 Esquisse pour unites Installation, Gallery do Theatre in Herbe, Paris, France, with Carinna Lojgren Williams;
1983 EncontrArte III, Park the Ejido, Quito, Ecuador; EncontrArte III with Cultural Factory the Cockroach, Parks of Urdesa, Guayaquil, Ecuador.
1981 Forum of Halls, Paris, France.

References

Ecuadorian painters
Contemporary artists
People from Guayaquil
1957 births
Living people